"Weekender/Asu e no YELL" is a single by Hey! Say! JUMP. It was released on September 3, 2014. It debuted in number one on the weekly Oricon Singles Chart and reached number one on the Billboard Japan Hot 100. It was the 29th best-selling single of 2014 in Japan, with 214,581 copies.

"Weekender" was used as the theme song for Ryosuke Yamada's drama, Kindaichi Shounen no Jikenbo Neo; "Asu e no YELL" was used as the theme song for Yuto Nakajima's drama, Suikyu Yankees.

Regular Edition
CD
 "Weekender" 
 "Asu e no YELL" 
 "Through the Night"
 "Rainbow Candy Girl" 
 "Weekender" (Original Karaoke)
 "Asu e no YELL" (Original Karaoke)
 "Through the Night" (Original Karaoke)
 "Rainbow Candy Girl" (Original Karaoke)

Limited Edition 1
CD
 "Weekender"
 "Asu e no YELL"

DVD
 "Weekender" (PV & Making of)

Limited Edition 2
CD
 "Asu e no YELL"
 "Weekender"

DVD
 "Asu e no YELL" (PV & Making of)

References 

2014 singles
2014 songs
Hey! Say! JUMP songs
Oricon Weekly number-one singles
Billboard Japan Hot 100 number-one singles